Ricardo Menéndez March (born ) is a Mexican-born New Zealand activist and politician who, since 2020, is a Member of Parliament for the Green Party of Aotearoa New Zealand in the House of Representatives.

Early life and career
The son of a Mexican father and New Zealand mother, Menéndez March moved to New Zealand from Tijuana, Baja California, Mexico. He worked as a film projectionist for a decade in Auckland, but was made redundant due to film digitisation. After that role, he worked in hospitality, then in migrant advocacy.

Menéndez March served as male co-convenor of Young Greens of Aotearoa New Zealand in 2016. At an Auckland University Students' Association 2016 Back Benches debate, a group of Young New Zealand First members started chanting “Build the Wall” at Menéndez March, who is of Mexican descent. Young New Zealand First later apologised to him.

Menéndez March is the coordinator for Auckland Action Against Poverty, a role he took up in late 2017. A writer for Stuff described him in 2020 as "a thorn in the side of the Labour-led Government in the past few years". In this role, he had frequently appeared on television, radio, and quoted in newspapers – once a week on average, by his estimate  – stating that the government had been failing the poor, that benefits are too low and housing is too expensive. Menéndez March has been particularly critical of Kiwibuild, arguing that the scheme should be targeted towards working poor and unemployed families and that the current set up will make homeownership rates fall further by encouraging increased property speculation and gentrification. 

Menéndez March is gay.

Political career

Menéndez March ran for the Green Party in the 2017 New Zealand general election. He ran in the  electorate and received 1,200 votes. He was 21 on the party list, and was placed too far down to be allocated a seat.

For the 2020 New Zealand general election, Menéndez March was placed tenth on the Green party list, and ran for the  electorate. During the election campaign, he criticised his party co-leader James Shaw for supporting $11.7m of funding for a private green school. Menéndez March did not win the Maungakiekie electorate, coming third place behind the National MP Denise Lee and Labour MP Priyanca Radhakrishnan, with 2,666 votes. However, the Greens received 7.9% of the party vote (226,754), and his list placement was high enough for him to enter Parliament as a list MP. Menéndez March was one of three new Green MPs in the 53rd Parliament.

In December 2020, Menéndez March travelled to Mexico during the COVID-19 pandemic to care for his family. His step-mother had aggressive cancer and had been given months to live, and his father had had major surgery with long-lasting effects. The person who had cared for the couple had become extremely ill herself and was unable to care for them. He was criticised by opposition leader Judith Collins for doing so. In late February, March drew media attention after National MP Chris Bishop disclosed that March had made two attempts to gain a place in "managed isolation and quarantine" for "national interest" reasons.

Views and positions

Socialism
Menéndez identifies as a "proud socialist" and has said that the Green Party would work hard to offer support to Labour to enact "genuine bold socialist policy".

Anti-monarchism
Before sitting in Parliament, Menéndez March expressed reluctance to swearing the required Oath of Allegiance to the Queen of New Zealand, Elizabeth II. He posted a meme about it, which received criticism from monarchists. However, he still took the oath.

Israel-Palestine
In May 2021, March drew media attention after he posted pictures on himself on Facebook and Twitter with the caption. "From the river to the sea, Palestine will be free!" in response to the 2021 Israel-Palestine crisis. The New Zealand Jewish Council criticised March's post, claiming that the slogan was used by Hamas to promote antisemitism and the ethnic cleansing of Jews. However, the use of the slogan was defended by Alternative Jewish Voice, arguing that freedom is not "a zero-sum business". March's posts led the libertarian ACT Party's Deputy Leader Brooke Van Velden to oppose the Green Party's motion calling for Members of Parliament to recognise the right of Palestinians to self-determination and statehood. In response to Van Velden's criticism, Green MP Golriz Ghahraman asserted that March was defending the rights of both Arabs and Jews to having equal rights in their homeland.

References

External links
 
 Maiden speech

1980s births
Living people
Politicians from Tijuana
Unsuccessful candidates in the 2017 New Zealand general election
Members of the New Zealand House of Representatives
Green Party of Aotearoa New Zealand MPs
New Zealand list MPs
LGBT members of the Parliament of New Zealand
Gay politicians
Mexican emigrants to New Zealand
New Zealand socialists
New Zealand people of Mexican descent